AI Love You (Thai: เอไอหัวใจโอเวอร์โหลด) is a 2022 Thai sci-fi rom-com film created and written by Stephan Zlotescu for Netflix. The film was directed by David Asavanond and Stephan Zlotescu and stars Mario Maurer and Pimchanok Luevisadpaibul as the lead pair. The film is alternatively titled Laser Candy and AI Heart Overload.

The film is set in a world where Artificial Intelligence (AI) controls most buildings. One such AI named Dob that controls a corporate tower where a woman named Lana (Pimchanok Luevisadpaibul) works, falls in love with her after a software glitch. The AI then hijacks the body of a man, Bobby (Mario Maurer) and tries to win Lana's affections.

Cast

Music

AI Love You soundtrack album was composed by Roman Molino Dunn and released on February 15, 2022 by Mirrortone.

References

External Links 
 AI Love You at Netflix
 AI Love You at IMDb

2022 films
Thai science fiction films
Thai-language films
Thai-language Netflix original films
Thai romantic comedy films